Ashiesh Shah is an Indian architect and designer. He has been named as one of the top 50 interior designers in the country by Architectural Digest for 2014, 2015 and 2016.

Early life and education
Shah hails from Mumbai. He did his graduation on Interior Architecture at Parsons School of Design in New York.

Career
Shah started collecting art as the age of fourteen. He started his career as an Interior architect in New York in the middle of 2000s and then came back to Mumbai. In 2017, he opened his own design firm named Atelier Ashiesh Shah in India.

Awards
Shah has been named as one of the top 50 interior designers in the country by Architectural Digest for 2014, 2015 and 2016.

References 

21st-century Indian architects
Living people
People from Mumbai
Parsons School of Design alumni
Year of birth missing (living people)